Larry Lehman (1945 – December 10, 2004) was a chief justice of the Wyoming Supreme Court.

Born in Iowa City, Iowa, Lehman received a JD from the University of Wyoming College of Law in 1976. He practiced with the firm of Vehar, Lehman, Beppler & Jacobson, P.C., in Evanston, Wyoming.

He served as a judge in Uinta County, Wyoming, from 1985 to 1988, and as a state district judge for Albany and Carbon counties. On July 8, 1994, Governor Mike Sullivan appointed Lehman was to a seat on the Wyoming Supreme Court. Lehman became chief justice in 2000, and was the first chief justice to serve a four-year term. He died from brain cancer, a month before he was scheduled to step down.

Sources
Justice Lehman dies at 59, Wyoming Star-Tribune (December 10, 2004).

1945 births
2004 deaths
Justices of the Wyoming Supreme Court
20th-century American judges
People from Uinta County, Wyoming
Chief Justices of the Wyoming Supreme Court